Princess Kara (born 2000) is a Nigerian discus thrower. She won both the National Championships and the African Under 20 Championships in 2019.

Career 

Kara participated in the 2016 National Youth Games and has also competed in the triple jump and shot put.

Kara won gold in discus throwing at the 2018 National Sports Festival (NSF) in Abuja. In 2019, she won both the national Under 20 Championships and the African Under 20 Championships, starting to challenge Chinwe Okoro and Chioma Onyekwere for the number one position in Nigeria. She also won the 2019 National Championships.

She competed for Central Arizona College, where she won consecutive NJCAA Division I Outdoor discus titles in 2021 and 2022.

References 

2000 births
Living people
Nigerian female discus throwers
Nigerian female shot putters
Athletes (track and field) at the 2019 African Games
African Games competitors for Nigeria
Central Arizona Vaqueros women's track and field athletes
Sportspeople from Port Harcourt